Lucas Humberto Assadi Reygadas (born 8 January 2004) is a Chilean professional footballer who plays as a forward for Chilean Primera División side Universidad de Chile.

Club career
In 2011, Assadi came to Universidad de Chile and made his professional debut at the age of 17 in a 2021 Copa Chile match against San Luis de Quillota on June 27, 2021.

International career
Assadi took part of the Chile U15 squad at the UEFA U-16 Development Tournament in Finland in April 2019. and also represented Chile U15 at the 2019 South American U-15 Championship, scoring two goals. Prior to this, he represented Chile U17 at the 2019 FIFA U-17 World Cup, making an appearance in the match against France U17. In 2022, he represented Chile U20 in a friendly match against Paraguay U20 and against Peru U20. In 2023, he made four appearances and scored one goal in the South American U20 Championship.

He represented Chile at under-23 level in a 1–0 win against Peru U23 on 31 August 2022, in the context of preparations for the 2023 Pan American Games.

Career statistics

Notes

References

External links
 
 Lucas Assadi at playmakerstats.com (English version of ceroacero.es)

Living people
2004 births
Footballers from Santiago
Chilean footballers
Chile youth international footballers
Chile under-20 international footballers
Universidad de Chile footballers
Chilean Primera División players
Association football forwards
21st-century Chilean people
Chilean people of Iranian descent
Chilean people of Palestinian descent